Joe Cappelletti  is an American voice actor.

Filmography

Anime roles
 Bobobo–bo Bo–bobo – Halekulani
 Eureka Seven – Radar Man, Teacher
 Fafner in the Azure – Ko
 Ghost in the Shell: Stand Alone Complex 2nd GIG – Section 1 Member
 Gun Sword – Viest
 Kyo Kara Maoh! – Boyd, Shoma Shibuya
 Lupin III Part 2 - Al Cabane
 MÄR – Avrute, Jim
 Mars Daybreak – Abbot
 Nodame Cantabile – Ryuji Tsuboi, Yasunori Kuroki
 Planetes – Sasha
 The Prince of Tennis – Tashiro
 Saiyuki Reload – Koumyou Sanzo
 Tenjou Tenge – Yasuji, Maskestront

Movie roles
 Final Fantasy VII: Advent Children Complete – Inhabitants of Midgar Edge
 Gnomes and Trolls: The Secret Chamber – Face
 One Missed Call – Oka
 Tarzan – Professor Archimed Porter

Video game roles
 Arcania: Gothic 4 – Various
 Army of Two: The 40th Day – US Elite
 Call of Duty: Black Ops – Additional Voices
 Command & Conquer 3: Tiberium Wars – GDI Soldier, GDI Transport
 Command & Conquer 4: Tiberian Twilight – GDI Soldier
 EverQuest II – Jenthis Viridar, Trainer Tahvolo Viljaan
 Final Fantasy XIII – Cocoon Inhabitants
 Final Fantasy XIII–2 – Additional Voices
 Gothic 3: Forsaken Gods – Additional Voices
 Grand Theft Auto V – The Local Population
 Infamous – Male Pedestrian
 Mafia II – Gas Station Attendant, Record Store Owner, Gangster
 Medal of Honor – SSG. Patterson
 Operation Flashpoint: Red River – Charlie Fireteam Leader
 Race Driver: Grid – USA Team Mate
 Red Faction Guerrilla –  Various
 Resident Evil 6 – BSAA
 Rock Revolution – Voice
 Samurai Champloo: Sidetracked – Plain Clothes Cop
 Saints Row: The Third – Pedestrian and Character Voices
 Shadow Hearts: Covenant – Yuri Hyuga
 Syndicate – Additional Voices
 The Last of Us Part II – Seraphites
 Ultimate Band – Voice
 Tony Hawk's Proving Ground – Spencer

References

External links
Official Website

Living people
20th-century American male actors
21st-century American male actors
American male video game actors
American male voice actors
Place of birth missing (living people)
Year of birth missing (living people)